Zydepunks (also billed as The Zydepunks) is an American band based in New Orleans, Louisiana.  Founded in 2003, they play a wide variety of multicultural music, including Cajun music and zydeco, Eastern European music, and punk rock. They perform in English, French, Spanish, Yiddish, Portuguese, and German. Their instrumentation includes vocals, violins, accordions, bass guitar, and drums.

Their music is released on Nine Mile Records. They have performed at the New Orleans Jazz and Heritage Festival, and throughout the United States. In November, 2009, the band performed as part of The Revival Tour. They have been reviewed by Rolling Stone magazine and USA Today.

As of 2012, the band is on hiatus. Frontman Juan Küffner currently leads the Sacramento, California-based Hollow Point Stumblers, which blends musical influences in a manner reminiscent of The Zydepunks. Many of the band's members perform with frequent Zydepunks collaborators Debauche, a New Orleans Gypsy punk band, and My Graveyard Jaw, a Southern Country rock outfit.

Band members
Juan Küffner – lead vocals, accordion, fiddle
Eve Venema – accordion, backing vocals
Joseph Lilly – drums, backing vocals
Scott Potts – bass, backing vocals
Denise Bonis – violin, backing vocals

Frequent collaborators and former members
Michael James – guitar
Joseph McGinty – fiddle
Vincent Schmidt – accordion
Patrick Keenan – bass

Discography
2004 – 9th Ward Ramblers
2005 – ...And The Streets Will Flow With Whiskey
2007 – Exile Waltz
2008 – Finisterre

References

External links
 
 
 
Zydepunks on MySpace

American punk rock groups
Gypsy punk groups
Musical groups established in 2003
Musical groups from New Orleans
Zydeco musicians